was a Japanese politician of the People's New Party, a member of the House of Representatives in the Diet (national legislature). A native of Noshiro, Akita and graduate of Chuo University he joined the Ministry of Construction in 1953. Leaving the ministry, he was elected to the House of Councilors in the Diet for the first time in 1977. In 1983 he was elected to the House of Representatives for the first time. From 1995 to 1996 he served as the Minister of Agriculture, Forestry and Fisheries in Tomiichi Murayama's cabinet. In 1998 he served briefly as Director General of the Japan Defense Agency.

In 2001, Norota received the civilian honor Padma Vibhushan from the President of India.

Norota died of bladder cancer on 23 May 2019 at a Tokyo hospital, aged 89.

References

External links 
  in Japanese.

|-

|-

|-

1929 births
2019 deaths
People from Noshiro, Akita
Politicians from Akita Prefecture
Chuo University alumni
Members of the House of Councillors (Japan)
Members of the House of Representatives (Japan)
Ministers of Agriculture, Forestry and Fisheries of Japan
Japanese defense ministers
Recipients of the Padma Vibhushan in public affairs
People's New Party politicians
21st-century Japanese politicians